Iceland competed at the 2015 European Games, in Baku, Azerbaijan from 12 to 28 June 2015.

Archery

Badminton

 Men's singles – Kari Gunnarsson
 Women's singles – Sara Högnadóttir

Fencing

 Women's individual sabre – Thorbjörg Ágústsdóttir

Gymnastics

Artistic
 Men's – Valgaro Reinhardsson
 Women's – Thelma Rut Hermannsdottir, Dominiqua Alma Belanyi, Norma Dogg Robertsdottir

Judo

 Men's 81 kg – Sveinbjörn Jun Iura
 Men's 100 kg – Thormóður Arni Jonsson

Karate

 Women's 68 kg – Telma Rut Frimannsdottir

Shooting

 Men's air pistol – Ásgeir Sigurgeirsson

References

Nations at the 2015 European Games
European Games
2015